Sternford Moyo is a Zimbabwean lawyer serving as the current president of International Bar Association. Upon his assumption to the IBA presidium, Sternford became the first person of African descent to lead the organization in its 74 years of existence.

Sternford is the Senior Partner and Chairman of one of Zimbabwe's oldest and largest law firms, Scanlen & Holderness, a firm which he joined in 1981. He is  also widely regarded as one of the leading corporate and commercial lawyers in Southern Africa.

In addition, he is a former President of both the Law Society of Zimbabwe and the Southern African Development Community Lawyers' Association, Co-Chairperson of the Human Rights Institute of the International Bar Association, Chairman of Stanbic Bank Zimbabwe Limited - a leading commercial bank in Zimbabwe which is a member of the Standard Bank group, Chairman of Schweppes Zimbabwe Limited, Chairman of the Zimbabwe Revenue Authority and Director of several companies including Alpha Media Holdings Limited, one of the largest and most diversified media companies and Portland Holdings Limited, one of the largest cement companies in Zimbabwe.

Biography 
Moyo was the Bar leader in Zimbabwe and Southern Africa, as well as Corporate leader in mining, and leadership development. He has been chosen by the United States Information Services to participate in a program which familiarizes young African leaders with the American legal system and its roots. He enroled a media advocacy course in Oxford University.

References 

20th-century Zimbabwean lawyers
Living people
Year of birth missing (living people)
21st-century Zimbabwean lawyers